The French ironclad Alma was a wooden-hulled armored corvette built for the French Navy in the late 1860s. The lead ship of her class, she was named after the 1854 Battle of Alma of the Crimean War. The ship spent her early career on the China Station and later supported the French occupation of Tunisia in 1881. She was condemned in 1886, but was not sold until 1893.

Design and description
The s were designed as improved versions of the armored corvette  suitable for foreign deployments. Unlike their predecessor the Alma-class ships were true central battery ironclads as they were fitted with armored transverse bulkheads. Like most ironclads of her era she was equipped with a metal-reinforced ram.

Propulsion
The ship had a single Mazeline horizontal return connecting-rod steam engine driving a single propeller. Her engine was powered by four oval boilers. On sea trials the engine produced  and the ship reached .

Armament
Alma mounted her four  Modèle 1864 breech-loading guns in the central battery on the battery deck. The other two 194 mm guns were mounted in barbettes on the upper deck, sponsoned out over the sides of the ship. The four  guns were also mounted on the upper deck. She later exchanged her 194 mm guns for newer Modèle 1870 guns. The guns could fire both solid shot and explosive shells.

Armor
The unarmored portions of her sides were protected by  iron plates.

Service
Alma was laid down at Lorient on 1 October 1865 and launched on 26 November 1867. The ship began her sea trials on 24 August 1869, but did not enter service until the following year, after sailing to Brest to have sheathing added to protect her armor. She was commissioned as the flagship of the China Squadron under command of Rear Admiral Dupré and the ship departed Brest on 15 June 1870. She grounded on a shoal in the Inland Sea on 15 July and lost her false keel.

On 24 August 1871 Alma rode out a typhoon in Yokohama. In May 1872, she was in collision with the Swedish barque Siam at Woosung, China. Siam sank; Alma developed a severe leak and was beached. She was relieved by Belliqueuse on 1 August 1872 and reached Toulon on 16 January 1873. The ship was assigned to the Evolutionary Squadron on 8 October 1873. She was in reserve in Cherbourg from 1876 to 1881. Alma recommissioned on 1 March 1881 and was assigned to the Levant Squadron. From 6–16 July 1881 the ship bombarded the Tunisian port of Sfax as part of the French occupation of Tunisia. She was reduced to reserve in Cherbourg on 8 January 1883. The ship was condemned on 12 March 1886, but Alma was not sold until May 1893 for 129,000 francs.

Notes

Footnotes

References
 

 
 
 

Ships built in France
Alma-class ironclads
1867 ships
Maritime incidents in May 1872